Gerard P. Reesink (more commonly known as Ger Reesink) is a Dutch linguist who specializes in Papuan languages.

Education
He studied psychology at Utrecht University. He obtained his PhD in linguistics at the University of Amsterdam, where he completed his dissertation Structures and their functions in Usan, a Papuan language of Papua New Guinea.

Research
In the 1990s, he researched the languages of the Bird's Head Peninsula as part of The Irian Jaya Studies: Program for Interdisciplinary Research (ISIR), which resulted in publications such as A grammar of Hatam (1999) and Languages of the eastern Bird's Head (2002). He also dealt with Papuan-Austronesian language contact in eastern Indonesia.

Publications
 West Papuan languages (2006)
 East Nusantara as a linguistic area (2008)
 Genetic and linguistic coevolution in northern Island Melanesia (2008)

Pacific Linguistics publications
Reesink, G.P. "Languages of the Aramia River Area". In Reesink, G.P., Fleischmann, L., Turpeinen, S. and Lincoln, P.C. editors, Papers in New Guinea Linguistics No. 19. A-45:1-38. Pacific Linguistics, The Australian National University, 1976. 
Reesink, G.P. A Grammar of Hatam, Irian Jaya, Indonesia. C-146, xvi + 230 pages. Pacific Linguistics, The Australian National University, 1999. 
Reesink, G. editor. Languages of the Eastern Bird's Head. PL-524, ix + 340 pages. Pacific Linguistics, The Australian National University, 2002. 
Reesink, G.P. "The eastern Bird's Head languages compared". In Reesink, G. editor, Languages of the Eastern Bird's Head. PL-524:1-44. Pacific Linguistics, The Australian National University, 2002. 
Reesink, G.P. "A grammar sketch of Sougb". In Reesink, G. editor, Languages of the Eastern Bird's Head. PL-524:181-276. Pacific Linguistics, The Australian National University, 2002. 
Reesink, G.P. "Mansim, a lost language of the Bird's Head". In Reesink, G. editor, Languages of the Eastern Bird's Head. PL-524:277-340. Pacific Linguistics, The Australian National University, 2002. 
Reesink, G. "West Papuan languages: roots and development". In Pawley, A., Attenborough, R., Golson, J. and Hide, R. editors, Papuan Pasts: Cultural, linguistic and biological histories of Papuan-speaking peoples. PL-572:185-218. Pacific Linguistics, The Australian National University, 2005.
Reesink, G. "A connection between Bird's Head and (Proto) Oceanic". In Evans, B. editor, Discovering history through language: papers in honour of Malcolm Ross. PL-605:181-192. Pacific Linguistics, The Australian National University, 2009.
Reesink, G. "Prefixation of arguments in West Papuan languages". In Ewing, M. and Klamer, M. editors, East Nusantara: Typological and areal analyses. PL-618:71-96. Pacific Linguistics, The Australian National University, 2010.

References

Living people
Linguists of Papuan languages
Linguists of West Papuan languages
Linguists from the Netherlands
Year of birth missing (living people)
University of Amsterdam alumni